Felipe Harboe Bascuñán (born 20 July 1972 in Eindhoven, Netherlands) is a Dutch-born Chilean politician from the Party for Democracy and current Senator in Congress. He is a former Deputy Interior Minister of Chile and acting Minister of the Interior and a Deputy in Congress.

On 12 January 2021, he resigned to the Chamber of Deputies of Chile to run for the Constitutional Convention (as well as Renato Garín and Hugo Gutiérrez).

Biograhpy

Early years
Harboe received his law degree from the Central University of Chile. During the government of Ricardo Lagos, Harboe served on the Santiago Intendancy, in the Ministry of the Secretary-General of the Presidency of Chile, and in the Ministry of the Interior of Chile as Deputy Minister of the Carabineros de Chile. He was named Deputy Interior Minister on January 30, 2006 by Lagos, and continued there when Michelle Bachelet took office. As Undersecretary, Harboe had to take the oath of office of the new ministers during the change in administrations on March 11, 2006.

Political career

Deputy Minister of the Interior
The position of Deputy Minister of the Interior is of great importance because it is responsible for coordinating the matters of public security and maintaining public order within the country. His main areas of specific work have been controlling major protests, like the 2006 student protests in Chile, strikes, unemployment, and anything else that threatens public order. Before the creation of the National Intelligence Agency of Chile (Agencia Nacional de Inteligencia de Chile), Harboe supervised the Public Security and Information Department (Dirección de Seguridad Pública e Informaciones, known as La Oficina). Currently he coordinates the work of the Carabineros and the Police Investigations (the Forces of Order and Security, Fuerzas de Orden y Seguridad) to fight crime.

After the resignation of Belisario Velasco on January 3, 2008, Harboe assumed the position of acting Minister of the Interior, the first time that office has been held in the nation's history.

In December 2008, Harboe resigned to his post of Undersecretary and started to organize a campaign to be elected as Deputy for the District 22 of Santiago Centro for the next Parliamentary Elections.

On March 13, 2009, Harboe was appointed by his party to take the vacant seat of former Deputy Carolina Tohá, who was chosen one day earlier by President Michelle Bachelet as Minister Secretary General of Government, in the District 22 of Santiago Centro, the same seat that he was campaigning for, and for which he is expected to run in the next Parliamentary Elections. He was sworn in on March 19, 2009.

References

External links
Official page in the Chamber of Deputies site

Central University of Chile alumni
Living people
1972 births
Party for Democracy (Chile) politicians
Chilean Ministers of the Interior
Members of the Chamber of Deputies of Chile
People from Eindhoven
20th-century Chilean lawyers
Senators of the LV Legislative Period of the National Congress of Chile
Members of the Chilean Constitutional Convention